Robert Taylor Hinton (July 11, 1878 – January 24, 1948) was an American college football and college basketball coach. He served as the head football coach at Georgetown College in Georgetown, Kentucky from 1907 to 1917 and again in 1919, compiling a record of 47–35.

Hinton died on January 24, 1948, at a hospital in Lexington, Kentucky.

References

1878 births
1948 deaths
Georgetown Tigers football coaches
Georgetown Tigers football players
Georgetown Tigers men's basketball coaches
Yale Bulldogs men's track and field athletes
People from Paris, Kentucky